Jiang Chen (born 1 March 1966) is a Chinese windsurfer. He competed at the 1988 Summer Olympics and the 1992 Summer Olympics.

References

External links
 
 

1966 births
Living people
Chinese windsurfers
Chinese male sailors (sport)
Olympic sailors of China
Sailors at the 1988 Summer Olympics – Division II
Sailors at the 1992 Summer Olympics – Lechner A-390
Asian Games gold medalists for China
Asian Games medalists in sailing
Sailors at the 1990 Asian Games
Medalists at the 1990 Asian Games
20th-century Chinese people
Place of birth missing (living people)